Take Another Picture is the second album by the band Quarterflash.  It was released in 1983 by Geffen Records and features the single, "Take Me to Heart," which reached No. 14 on the US Billboard Hot 100. It also hit No. 6 on the Billboard Album Rock Tracks chart and No. 28 Adult Contemporary. The title track became the follow-up single, which reached No. 58 on the Hot 100.

Track listing 
All songs written by Marv Ross, except for where noted.
 "Take Me to Heart" – 3:30
 "Take Another Picture" – 4:27
 "Shane"  (Marv Ross, Rindy Ross)  – 4:30
 "Eye to Eye"  (Jack Charles, Marv Ross)  – 4:11
 "It Don't Move Me"  (Charles, Ross, Ross)  – 4:03
 "Shakin' the Jinx" – 4:55
 "Make It Shine" – 4:08
 "One More Round to Go"  (Charles)  – 3:40
 "Nowhere Left to Hide"  (Ross, Ross)  – 4:02
 "It All Becomes Clear"  (Charles, Ross)  – 2:20

Personnel
Rindy Ross – lead vocals, alto and soprano saxophones
Marv Ross – guitars, guitar synthesizer
Jack Charles – lead vocals, guitar
Rick DiGiallonardo – piano, synthesizers, Hammond B-3 organ
Rich Gooch – bass, backing vocals
Brian David Willis – drums, backing vocals, percussion

Additional Personnel :
Paulinho Da Costa – additional percussion
Joe Walsh – slide guitar on "It Don't Move Me"
John Boylan – OBXa on "It All Becomes Clear"
Bill Champlin – additional backing vocals
Timothy Schmit – additional backing vocals
Tommy Funderburk – additional backing vocals
Tom Kelly – additional backing vocals

References

Quarterflash albums
1983 albums
Albums produced by John Boylan (record producer)
Geffen Records albums